Armenia has participated in the Junior Eurovision Song Contest since . Armenian Public Television (ARMTV), a member organisation of the European Broadcasting Union (EBU), have been responsible for the selection process of their participants since their debut.

The first representative to participate for the nation at the  contest was Arevik with the song "", which finished in second place out of 17 participating entries, achieving a score of 136 points. The worst result to date was achieved by two representatives: L.E.V.O.N. at the Junior Eurovision Song Contest 2018 with his song "L.E.V.O.N" and Karina Ignatyan at the Junior Eurovision Song Contest 2019 with her song "Colours of Your Dream", both placing ninth.

History

Armenian broadcaster Armenian Public Television (ARMTV), announced on 21 May 2007 that they would be making their Junior Eurovision debut at the 2007 contest in Rotterdam, Netherlands on 8 December 2007. ARMTV internally selected Arevik as their debut entrant with the song "". At the running order draw for Junior Eurovision 2007, Armenia were drawn third, following  and preceding , where they finished in second place scoring 136 points.

Following their debut success, Armenia continued to participate in the Junior Eurovision Song Contest, finishing in third place on two occasions (and ), runners-up at five contests (and ),  and achieving their first win at the Junior Eurovision Song Contest 2010 with the song "Mama", performed by Vladimir Arzumanyan achieving 120 points.

Armenia were the host country of the Junior Eurovision Song Contest 2011, which took place on 3 December at the Karen Demirchyan Sports and Concerts Complex located in the Armenian capital, Yerevan. It was the first time in history of the Junior Eurovision Song Contest that the contest was held in the previous year's winning country. ARMTV was the main organiser of the show, being provided financial aid from the EBU made of entrance fees from the participating broadcasters, while Swedish company HD Resources assisted with the technical side of the production.

The Armenian broadcaster announced on 21 July 2016, that they would be participating at the contest being held in Valletta, Malta on 20 November 2016. ARMTV announced on 10 August 2016 that they had internally selected Anahit Adamyan and Mary Vardanyan to represent them at the contest, singing the song "". They placed second with total 232 points after Georgia, beaten only by 7 points.

On 26 February 2018, ARMTV revealed that their 12th Junior Eurovision entry would be selected using .

Despite being included on the final list of participating countries, Armenia withdrew from the  contest in November 2020 due to the ongoing Nagorno-Karabakh war. It was later revealed that Maléna had been internally selected to represent Armenia with the song "Why". With the Nagorno-Karabakh war ending on 10 November, Armenia's head of delegation David Tserunyan wrote on Instagram that the country "will come back stronger than ever".

On 2 September 2021, it was confirmed by the EBU that Armenia would return to the 2021 contest in France. Armenia again selected Maléna, who ultimately won the contest with 224 points.

It was confirmed on 21 December 2021 that Armenia would host the Junior Eurovision Song Contest 2022.

Participation overview

Commentators and spokespersons
The contests are broadcast online worldwide through the official Junior Eurovision Song Contest website junioreurovision.tv and YouTube. In 2015, the online broadcasts featured commentary in English by junioreurovision.tv editor Luke Fisher and 2011 Bulgarian Junior Eurovision Song Contest entrant Ivan Ivanov. The Armenian broadcaster, ARMTV, send their own commentators to each contest in order to provide commentary in the Armenian language. Spokespersons were also chosen by the national broadcaster in order to announce the awarding points from Armenia. The table below list the details of each commentator and spokesperson since 2007.

Hostings

See also
Armenia in the Eurovision Song Contest – Senior version of the Junior Eurovision Song Contest.
Armenia in the Eurovision Young Dancers – A competition organised by the EBU for younger dancers aged between 16 and 21.
Armenia in the Eurovision Young Musicians – A competition organised by the EBU for musicians aged 18 years and younger.

Notes

References 

 
Countries in the Junior Eurovision Song Contest